Walter Simon Johnson (1 September 1887 – 9 October 1962) was an Australian rules footballer who played with Fitzroy in the Victorian Football League (VFL).

Family
The son of Thomas Henry Johnson (1866-1915), and Eliza Caroline Johnson (1863-1949), née Thomas, Walter Simon Johnson was born in Collingwood on 1 September 1887.  He died on 9 October 1962.

Football
Having initially tried to play with Collingwood, Johnson made his debut for Fitzroy in 1907 and finished the year as the club's joint best and fairest winner. He played most of his career at half back but played up forward for his first three seasons, topping Fitzroy's goal-kicking in 1908 with 27 goals.

A member of their premiership side in 1913, the following season Johnson represented Victoria at the Sydney Carnival. In 1916 he was appointed club captain and led the side to the premiership, defeating Carlton in the grand final. Fitzroy had actually finished the home and away season in last position; but, because of the war, only four teams were competing, and all qualified for the semi finals.

For the next two years Johnson lived in the United Kingdom, where he worked in a munitions factory, before returning to Australia for one last season in 1919.

After retiring as a Fitzroy player, he was appointed captain-coach of the Ballarat Imperial Football Club in 1924. He retired before the 1926 season commenced and took up umpiring.

Footnotes

References

External links

 Find a Grave: Walter Simon Johnson.
 Boyles Football Photos: Wally Johnson.

1887 births
1962 deaths
Australian rules footballers from Melbourne
Australian Rules footballers: place kick exponents
Fitzroy Football Club players
Fitzroy Football Club Premiership players
Mitchell Medal winners
Two-time VFL/AFL Premiership players
People from Collingwood, Victoria